Guimaras , officially the Province of Guimaras, is an island province in the Philippines located in the Western Visayas region. The capital is Jordan, while the largest local government unit for it is the municipality of Buenavista. The province is situated in Panay Gulf, between the islands of Panay and Negros. To the northwest is the province of Iloilo and to the southeast is Negros Occidental. The whole island is part of the Metro Iloilo–Guimaras, one of the twelve metropolitan areas of the Philippines.

The province consists primarily of Guimaras Island, and also includes Inampulugan, Guiwanon (or Guiuanon), Panobolon, Natunga, Nadulao, and many surrounding islets. 

Guimaras, formerly known as Himal-os, was a sub-province of Iloilo until it was made an independent province on May 22, 1992.

History

Spanish era
About 1581, Gonzalo Ronquillo de Peñalosa, Spanish governor and Captain-General of the Philippine Islands, established a settlement in Guimaras for the purpose of Christianizing the island's natives. He and his subordinates organized the pueblicitos or villages of Nayup under the patronage of Saint Peter the Apostle, and Igang with Saint Anne as patroness.

Evangelization of Guimaras occurred around the same time the friars were making inroads in Panay. The Augustinians established the visitas (chapelries) of Nayup and Igang as subordinate to Oton, Iloilo. Gómez Pérez Dasmariñas, the 7th Spanish Governor-General, noted in a June 20, 1591, report to King Philip II that the friars of Oton made regular visits to the island.

In 1742, the island came under the jurisdiction of Dumangas – now known as Iloilo, until 1751 when the Augustinian Order was replaced by the Jesuits, after which the Dominican order took over Guimaras. The Jesuits, who had established a school in Iloilo and had missions in Molo and Arevalo, took charge of the island. By 1755, it was organized into a regular parish. When the population increased considerably, the island was given its municipal status with a seat of government at Tilad (today Buenavista).

American era
Under American rule, the Guimarasnons were given the opportunity to elect their municipal president in 1908.

Douglas MacArthur, a fresh graduate from West Point as a Second Lieutenant at the age of 23, came to Iloilo as the head of the company of U.S. Army Corps of Engineers. They constructed roads and the Santo Rosario Wharf, presently named MacArthur's Wharf, which are still in use today. In November 1903, while working on Guimaras, he was ambushed by a pair of Filipino brigands or guerrillas; he shot and killed both with his pistol.

In 1942, Japanese Imperial forces landed on Guimaras Island as the Empire of Japan began its occupation of the country during the Second World War. The Japanese controlled almost every island between the Philippines and Hawaii. The U.S. Forces needed these islands to run aircraft to and from the Philippines, while denying Japan usage. The U.S. Army and Navy planned indirect attacks that would eventually lead them to Luzon.  

In 1945, 10 U.S. divisions and 5 independent regiments would battle for Luzon, making it the largest campaign of the war and involving more troops than the United States had used in North Africa, Italy or southern France. The combined United States and Philippine Commonwealth forces landed on Guimaras Island, attacking the Japanese and defeating them in the Battle of Guimaras, which led to the liberation of the island.

Provincial status
Guimaras gained its status as a sub-province of Iloilo through Republic Act 4667, which was enacted by Congress on June 18, 1966. It was proclaimed as a regular and full-fledged province on May 22, 1992, after a plebiscite was conducted to ratify the approval of its conversion pursuant to Section 462 of R.A. 7160.

Shortly after Guimaras acquired its provincial status, President Fidel V. Ramos appointed Emily Relucio-López as its first Governor.

The province of Guimaras was originally composed of three municipalities: Buenavista, Jordan, and Nueva Valencia. In 1995, through Republic Act No. 7896 and Republic Act No. 7897, the municipalities of Sibunag and San Lorenzo were created. The two new municipalities officially acquired their municipal status after the May 8, 1995, plebiscite held simultaneously with the local election.

Ernesto L. Gedalanga was the first appointed mayor of Sibunag and Arsenio Zambarrano was also appointed mayor of San Lorenzo. The temporary seat of government of the Municipality of Sibunag is at Barangay Dasal while the temporary seat of Government of the Municipality of San Lorenzo is at Barangay Cabano.

Guimaras oil spill
In August 2006, the Guimaras oil spill occurred. The Philippine Coast Guard called this the worst oil spill in the country's history. According to officials,  of mangroves were affected, including parts of the Taklong Island National Marine Reserve.

Geography
Guimaras comprises primarily of Guimaras Island, and the minor islets of Inampulugan, Guiwanon (or Guiuanon), Panobolon, Natunga, Nadulao and many more. The province covers a total area of  occupying the southeastern section of the Western Visayas region.

Mount Dinulman is the second highest mountain with an elevation of  also located in Sibunag.

The province has 5 municipalities. There is only one legislative district of Guimaras which encompasses all five towns.

Demographics

The people of the province, called Guimarasnon, speak Hiligaynon as the primary language, as it was once a sub-province of Iloilo. Filipino and English are widely spoken and understood.

Religion
The two predominant religions in the municipality are the Roman Catholic Church and the Iglesia Filipina Independiente (Philippine Independent Church). The St. Paul's Theological Seminary (SPTS) in Jordan is the regional seminary of the Philippine Independent Church serving its Visayas and Mindanao dioceses.

Economy

TThe sectors having the most potential to support Guimaras' economic development are mangoes, tourism, cashew cultivation, and food processing. Another expanding sector is fishery, which includes growing seaweed. Infrastructure, capacity-building initiatives, more favorable legislation, and higher investments are just a few examples of local variables that have boosted the potential growth of these industries.

Guimaras is well known for its agricultural crops, particularly the mangoes, half of all exported mangoes come from this island. The island province is famous for producing one of the sweetest mangoes in the world, thus earning the nickname "Mango Capital of the Philippines" from local and foreign tourists. Guimaras mangoes are reportedly served at the White House and Buckingham Palace. Guimaras' largest event of the year is the Manggahan Festival (the Mango Festival). The variety of mangoes produced are also best for making dried mangoes, jam and other special delicacies. They also produce other fruits and vegetables such as bananas, tomatoes, and eggplants among others.

Transportation

Pump boats cross regularly from Ortiz in Iloilo City to Jordan, Guimaras, taking about 20 to 25 minutes per journey. Other ferries leave from the Parola Wharf in Iloilo to Buenavista, Guimaras. The Parola Wharf is used exclusively during rough weather conditions especially by ferries from Jordan-Ortiz. A roll-on/roll-off ferry travels around 5 times a day but is mostly used to transport cargo such as sacks of charcoals and root crops across the Iloilo Strait.

There is also a pump boat service connecting the town of San Lorenzo to Pulupandan in Negros Occidental.

Government
The Governor of Guimaras is Joaquin Carlos Rahman A. Nava, a member of the National Unity Party. The province's Vice Governor is John Edward G. Gando, a member of PDP–Laban. Guimaras is represented in the Philippine House of Representatives by Lucille Nava, also a member of PDP–Laban.

Tourism
Guimaras attracts tourists particularly in May, when the Manggahan Festival takes place. In the festival, locals wear mango-inspired costumes and design mango-themed floats in a parade that makes its way around the island. Pastries and confectionery with mango ingredients, as well unprepared mangoes, are also sold in relatively large quantities. Tourism also includes visits to agricultural areas across the island, such as the Oro Verde Mango Plantation.

The island is also a growing destination for ecotourism. Talkong Island, off Guimaras' south coast, is a area of natural beauty recognized by the Philippine government. Tourists frequently visit areas such as the Guisi, Alubihod, Tatlong Pulo, and Natago beaches. Ave Maria Island is another ecological destination near Jordan. Some tourists also choose to visit the San Lorenzo Wind Farm, a series of turbines located near the island's eastern coast.

Guimaras is also a site for religious tourism. The Balaan Bukid Shrine hosts twelve markers of the Way of the Cross as individuals make an ascent towards a hilltop where the main shrine rests. Navalas Church, built between 1880 and 1885, bears one of the few remaining sites of Roman Catholic Spanish heritage on the island. The Trappist Monastery is located near the center of the island, providing a retreat center for visitors in addition to selling various mango-based foodstuffs to help support the monks of the monastery.

See also
 List of islands of the Philippines
 Taklong Island National Marine Reserve

References

External links

 
 Provincial Government of Guimaras
 

 
Provinces of the Philippines
Provinces of Western Visayas
Island provinces of the Philippines
States and territories established in 1992
1992 establishments in the Philippines
Former sub-provinces of the Philippines